Pretty Rhythm: Rainbow Live is a 2013 anime series and the third entry in the Pretty Rhythm animated franchise. Unlike the previous two seasons, Pretty Rhythm: Aurora Dream and Pretty Rhythm: Dear My Future, Rainbow Live features an all-new cast centered on a separate storyline. Character designs were provided by Okama, while Mai Matsuura oversaw character designs for the male characters. The series is centered on two Prism Star groups, Happy RAIN and Bell Rose, who compete in Prism Shows, live performances that use a combination of figure skating, singing, and dancing, which are then judged based on how charmed the judges and spectators are. The characters perform special moves called Prism Jumps, which are also scored based on how many Prism Jump combinations can be performed at once. During Prism Shows, the characters can perform Prism Lives, which turns their Pair Friends into instruments.

Each character has their own style of performance and song to perform to. Halfway throughout the series, the characters team up for the Winter White Session, a duo competition, with each performing a duet: Naru and Bell with "Little Wings & Beautiful Pride"; Ann and Wakana with "Cherry-picking Days"; Ito and Otoha with "Alive"; and Rinne and June with "Sevendays Love, Sevendays Friend."

After the series' end, Naru continues to appear in other related Pretty Series spin-offs, such as Kiratto Pri Chan. The male supporting cast, Koji, Hiro, and Kazuki, later became the main focus of Pretty Rhythm: Rainbow Live'''s spin-off, the King of Prism film series, after positive feedback from releasing the full version of their theme song, "Athletic Core", and cheer screenings.

Main characters

Happy RAIN

 is a Prism Star unit composed of Prism Stone employees Naru Ayase, Ann Fukuhara, and Ito Suzuno.

Naru is 14 years old and a natural airhead who can see the "color" of the music. Naru becomes Prism Stone's shop manager for her school's work experience program, and her dream is to be a shop owner of a fashionable shop like Dear Crown. One of her specialties is decorating Prism Stones. Her catchphrase is "So happy!"
As a Prism Star, Naru is a lovely-style performer and uses the Prism Rainbow Guitar during Prism Lives, performing the song "Heart Iro Tori Dream." Near the end of the series, she returns the Prism's sparkle. Afterwards, she becomes a well-known Prism Star and begins working at Dear Crown as a model.

Ann is 14 years old and is able to taste the "color" of the music. Ann is the class representative of Naru and Ito's class and the president of the school's Prism Show Club, with a fascination for aliens. She enjoys sweets, but her father actively discourages her from making them to work in their family's senbei store instead. Ann is hired as the main pastry chef of Prism Stone's sweets corner. Later in the series, she realizes she is in love with her upperclassman, Kazuki. Her catchphrase is "Leave it to Ann!"
As a Prism Star, Ann is a pop-style performer and uses the Prism Rainbow Drums during Prism Lives, performing the song "Sweet Time Cooking Magic (Harapeko Nan Desu Watashi tte)."

Ito is 14 years old and is able to feel the "heat" of the music. She has a cool, indifferent personality and prefers to be called by her nickname . Her parents are divorced, but Ito keeps a purple Prism Stone in her pocket as a gift from her mother and learned the piano from her. Ito is in love with Koji and begins dating him in the middle of the series. Ito is hired as the make-up artist of Prism Stone, mostly because she hopes to purchase her father's old guitar from a pawn shop. Her catchphrase is "Intense!"
As a Prism Star, Ito is a cool-style performer and uses the Prism Rainbow Keyboard during Prism Lives, performing the song "BT37.5."

Rinne is a mysterious amnesic girl who is missing emotions and has the appearance of being 14-15 years old. She previously appeared on the Nintendo 3DS port of the original Pretty Rhythm arcade game, Pretty Rhythm: My Deco Rainbow Wedding. She draws the attention of her rivals for being able to perform four Prism Jump combinations. When she begins attending Naru's school, she registers under the name , with Chisato's surname.
Rinne is revealed to be one of the group-minded messengers from the Prism World. As a Prism Messenger, Rinne is tasked with spreading the Prism Sparkle across the world, but the rules of the Prism World state that she is not allowed to fall in love or perform in Prism Shows. When her mission is completed, she must return to the Prism World, a process that will also cause her to lose her memories, and be absorbed by a new Rinne-type messenger. After remembering her mission, Rinne realizes that June is the cause of her current memory loss, after she tries to prevent them from merging.
As a Prism Star, Rinne is a star-style performer and uses the Prism Rainbow Guitar during Prism Lives, performing the song "Gift".

 Bell Rose 
 is a Prism Star unit from Edel Rose composed of Bell Renjoji, Otoha Takanashi, and Wakana Morizono, middle school students from Le Celiana Girls Academy. Their group song is "Rosette Nebula".

Bell is 14 years old and one of the top Prism Stars at Edel Rose. She is able to feel the "love" of music. Bell sees herself as Naru's rival after she is rejected as Prism Stone's manager in favor of the former and also becomes curious about Rinne for being able to perform four Prism Jumps. Having been under pressure to perform perfectly in school and violin from childhood, Bell sees her only escape in Prism Shows and her friendship with Otoha and Wakana.
As a Prism Star, Bell is a sexy-style performer and uses the Prism Rainbow Violin during Prism Lives, performing the song "Get Music!" By the end of the series, she wins the Over the Rainbow Session and becomes the new Prism Queen.

Otoha is a timid 14-year-old Prism Star from Edel Rose who is able to smell the "scent" of music. She enjoys brewing tea and fairytales. She cares for Bell deeply and acts as her personal assistant. Because of this, Otoha is observant about minor details to ensure that everything is perfectly ready. For a brief period of time, she works at Prism Stone after Bell forces her out of the group, but with Ito's encouragement, she learns to be more outgoing and honest about her feelings. Her catchphrase is "Like a fairytale!"
As a Prism Star, Otoha is a feminine-style performer and uses the Prism Rainbow Saxophone during Prism Lives, performing the song "Vanity Colon." 

Wakana is a 14-year-old girl Prism Star from Edel Rose who is able to feel the "wind" of music. She tells fortunes with Prism Stones and she views Ann as her rival. Having grown up in a strict family, Wakana spent most of her childhood moving away due to her father's job and thus refuses to let herself become emotionally attached to others. When Kazuki teaches her not to be afraid of taking risks and Ann helps her learn how to trust her friends, she realizes how important Bell and Otoha's friendships are to her.
As a Prism Star, Wakana is an ethnic-style performer and uses the Prism Rainbow Xylophone during Prism Lives, performing the song "Blowin' in the Mind."

Recurring characters

Prism Stone

Chisato is the owner of Prism Stone and Rinne's guardian who loves to eat sweets.

DJ Coo is the DJ of Prism Stone, who created Momo's robotic body and operates the Prism Trailer whenever Prism Stone goes on tour. Rei's Prism Jump is "EZ Do Burning." The character DJ Coo is an homage to DJ Koo from TRF.

 Over the Rainbow 
Over the Rainbow is a Prism Star unit from Edel Rose consisting of "genius" Koji Mihama, "king" Hiro Hayami, and "charisma" Kazuki Nishina, who debut at the finale of Pretty Rhythm: Rainbow Live. The members are second-year high school students at Kakyoin Academy. Their group song is "Athletic Core" and "Nijiiro Crown." Their Trio Jump is "Over the Rainbow", "Unexpected Heartbeat First Kiss", and "Heartbeat Cycling."

Prior to the end of Rainbow Live, the boys were referred to as the Prism Boys. The characters later become the main focus of the films King of Prism by Pretty Rhythm and King of Prism: Pride the Hero.

A genius songwriter, Koji spends time playing the guitar on the roof of his apartment complex but refuses to be involved in Prism Shows. In the past, he was originally planned to debut with Hiro and wrote their debut song, "Pride." After Jin forced Hiro to debut solo and claim songwriting credits, Koji left Edel Rose, having been disgusted with Edel Rose valuing fame over friendship. He becomes attracted to Ito through her music and Prism Shows, and they begin dating in the middle of the series.
As a Prism Star, Koji performs the song "Reboot."

Hiro is a top Prism Star from Edel Rose. His relationship with Koji is shaky since his solo debut, and he manipulates Naru and her friends in an attempt to urge him to return to Prism Shows. He works to support his poor mother, and when offered the chance to debut without Koji, Hiro accepted it, including claiming songwriting credits for the song "Pride", which he uses as his theme song. After admitting that Jin had forced him to claim songwriting credits from Koji, Hiro repairs his friendship with him and later reunites with his mother.
As a Prism Star, Hiro is a star-style performer, with the song "Pride."

Kazuki is Ann's upperclassmen and former club mentor. He is seen as an older brother figure by other street-style dancers. Ann and Wakana are both in love with him, although he is oblivious about this. Kazuki is also Koji's childhood friend. He sees Rei Kurokawa as his idol and specializes in street-style performances, which are yet to be accepted due to breaking rules established by academy-style performances.
As a Prism Star, Kazuki is a burning-style performer, with the song "Freedom."

Dear Crown

June is a Prism Star exclusively modeling for the shop Dear Crown, and Naru idolizes her. She was the winner of the Prism Queen Cup four years ago and famous for being the first Prism Star who can do four Prism Jump combinations.
June is revealed to be a Rinne-type messenger from the Prism World. She had chosen Hijiri to spread the Prism Sparkle, but after falling in love with him, she disobeys the rules of the Prism World by performing in his place at Prism Shows due to his injury, thereby preventing other Prism Stars from spreading the Prism Sparkle. Realizing that her memories with Hijiri mean a lot to her, she defects from the Prism World by turning her Rainbow Feathers into Night Dream Feathers, even if this means that her body will eventually collapse. At the end of the series, the Prism Goddess allows her to remain in the human world with Hijiri at the cost of losing her ability to perform in Prism Shows and erasing her memories.
As a Prism Star, June is a star-style performer and uses the Prism Rainbow Baton during Prism Lives, performing with the song "Nth Color."

Pair Friends

Lovelin is a pink penguin paired with Naru who represents the "lovely" part of Peacock. She was introduced in Episode 1 and loves decorating as much as Naru does. Lovelyn can turn into Lovely Charm Stone, which holds the Lovely Dress Set of the Seventh Coord. While Naru is performing a Prism Live, Lovelin turns into the Prism Rainbow Guitar.

Poppun is a blue penguin paired with Ann who represents the "pop" part of Peacock. He loves eating the sweets Ann makes. Poppun can turn into Pop Charm Stone, which holds the Pop Dress Set of the Seventh Coord. While Ann is performing a Prism Live, Poppun turns into the Prism Rainbow Drumsticks.

Coolun is a purple penguin paired with Ito who represents the "cool" part of Peacock. She cries very easily and takes care of Ito, helping her confront her true emotions. Coolun can turn into Cool Charm Stone, which holds the Cool Dress Set of the Seventh Coord. While Ito is performing a Prism Live, Coolun turns into the Prism Rainbow Keyboard.

Sessni is a hot pink penguin paired with Bell who represents the "sexy" part of Peacock. Unlike the other Pair Friends, she decides not to hatch until Bell shows genuine kindness. Sessni can turn into Sexy Charm Stone, which holds the Sexy Dress Set of the Seventh Coord. While Bell is performing a Prism Live, Sessni turns into the Prism Rainbow Violin.

Femini is a yellow penguin paired with Otoha who represents the "feminine" part of Peacock. She first appears to Otoha after Otoha was able to stand up to Bell. Femini can turn into Feminine Charm Stone, which holds the Feminine Dress Set of the Seventh Coord. While Otoha is performing a Prism Live, Femini turns into the Prism Rainbow Saxophone.

Ethni is a green penguin paired with Wakana who represents the "ethnic" part of Peacock. She first appears to Wakana after she stops focusing on not making mistakes. Ethni can turn into Ethnic Charm Stone, which holds the Ethnic Dress Set of the Seventh Coord. While Wakana is performing a Prism Live, Ethni turns into the Prism Rainbow Xylophone.

Peacock is a white penguin with a rainbow tail paired with Rinne. He is the combination of all seven other Pair Friends. He can turn into Star Charm Stone, which holds the Star Dress Set of the Seventh Coord. While Rinne is performing a Prism Live, Peacock turns into the Prism Rainbow Guitar.

Starn is a white penguin paired with June who represents the "star" part of Peacock. While June is performing a Prism Live, Starn turns into the Prism Rainbow Baton, and she can also transform into two Prism Rainbow Guitars during June and Rinne's duet.

Edel Rose

Hijiri is the chairman of the Prism Show Association and, later on, the new supervisor at Edel Rose. He was a student at Edel Rose four years prior, where he met June and taught her about Prism Shows. Noting June resembled his deceased mother, he fell in love with her. He is a former Prism Star who had to end his career prematurely after his half-brother, Jin, permanently damaged his leg. 

Jin is the supervisor of Edel Rose and the current Prism King after winning the Prism King Cup. However, he was able to win by sabotaging his opponents and teaches the same philosophy to Edel Rose students. He resents June for leaving Edel Rose to be with Hijiri and uses Spartan techniques to discipline the students. He is later fired after his father, Kou Norizuki, discovers he had been manipulating the media in favor for Edel Rose. In King of Prism, Jin establishes the school Schwarz Rose, having amassed most of Edel Rose's assets and students after Kou's death.

Minor characters

 Family

 and 

Ryūnosuke and Poemu are Naru's parents. Ryūnosuke is an author of children's books, while Poemu is a storybook artist.

 and 

Sentarō and Yuriko are Ann's parents and run a senbei store.

Gen is the owner of the music club Lucky Star and a former guitarist in the band Crossroad. After breaking his arm, he is no longer able to play the guitar. He was friends with Koji's father, Takeyuki Mihama, and who died in the same accident.

Tsuru is Ito's mother, who left Gen after sensing his change in attitude following his permanent arm injury.

 and 

Soshi is Otoha's father and was raised in a rich family. He works as a stay-at-home dad. Otogi is Otoha's mother and works at a publishing company. The two married after gaining their trust of Soshi's family, despite their opposition of him marrying a woman of lower status.

  and 

Tadashi is Wakana's father. He used to be a salaryman who was very focused on his work, and was willing to sacrifice the happiness of his family for it. However, after seeing Futaba's true self emerge during a fight, he returned to being his true self, and reconciled with his wife and daughter. Futaba is Wakana's mother. Although she is very subservient to her husband, she reverts to her normal, tomboyish personality. When she is angry, she is extremely threatening, the opposite of her usual attitude.

 and 

Ritsu is Ren's strict mother, who also expect perfect results from Bell in both Prism Show and violin, as well as perfect scores on all of the school tests. :Yukihide is Bell's father. He works overseas and only sees Bell once a few years. He is one of the reasons that Ritsu is often stressed and he always has high expectations for Bell.

Natsuko is the general manager of Dear Crown in Pretty Rhythm: Rainbow Live'' and Koji's mother. She opposes Ito and Koji's relationship at first due to Ito's father, Gen, causing her husband's death, but later accepts it.

Ms. Hayami is the single mother of Hiro. She and her son lived in poverty together, and although she often neglected him, Hiro still loves her. Although she was once unemployed, she currently works at a retirement home.

Other

 and 

Ai and Rina are Naru's classmates and friends.

The Prism Goddess is the goddess of the Prism World.

References

Pretty Rhythm
Pretty Rhythm